Sweethearts on Parade may refer to:
Sweethearts on Parade (1930 film), American musical comedy
Sweethearts on Parade (1944 film) or Sweethearts of the U.S.A., American musical comedy 
Sweethearts on Parade (1953 film), American drama
"Sweethearts on Parade", 1928 jazz standard by Carmen Lombardo
Sweethearts on Parade, Australian pop group founded in 1969 with Cathy Wayne on lead vocals